Dean Lake is a lake in the U.S. state of Montana.

Dean Lake was named after Richard Dean, a local ranger.

See also
List of lakes in Flathead County, Montana (A-L)

References

Lakes of Montana
Lakes of Flathead County, Montana